E-minis are futures contracts that represent a fraction of the value of standard futures. They are traded primarily on the Chicago Mercantile Exchange's Globex electronic trading platform. E-mini contracts were first launched in 1997 for the S&P 500 index with great success, and are now available on a wide range of stock market indices, commodities and currencies. As of April, 2011, CME lists 44 unique E-mini contracts, of which approximately 10 have average daily trading volumes of over 1,000 contracts.

Some E-mini contracts provide trading advantages, including high liquidity (and therefore tight spread), greater affordability for individual investors due to lower margin requirements than the full-size contracts, and round-the-clock trading 23.25 hours a day from Sunday afternoon to Friday afternoon. Under U.S. tax law, E-minis may qualify as 1256 Contracts, and benefit from several tax advantages as well.

The risk of loss is also amplified by the higher leverage.

Symbology 
Most E-mini futures expire quarterly (with the exception of agricultural products), in March, June, September, and December. An E-mini future symbol is formed by starting with the root symbol and adding the expiration month letter (the same as for futures) and the last digit of the expiration year. For example, the E-mini S&P 500 expiring in December 2012 has the symbol ESZ2.

E-mini contracts 
The table below lists some of the more popular E-mini contracts, with the initial and maintenance margins required by CME. Note that individual brokers may require different margin amounts (also called performance bonds).

E-mini options
Options on E-minis exist for the E-mini S&P 500 and the E-mini NASDAQ-100.

See also
E-mini S&P
E-micro
Dow futures
NASDAQ futures
S&P futures
1256 Contract

References

Derivatives (finance)